Manama Club is a Bahraini professional football club, founded in 1946 and based in Manama, that competes in the Bahraini Premier League, the top flight of Bahraini football.

Manama Club, formally known as Al Taj, is a well-known basketball club in the Gulf and Asia. They have two Gulf Championships, and were the first-ever Bahraini club and second-ever Gulf club to come in third place in the 2000 ABC Champions Cup. Manama Club has won over 45 titles in domestic competitions. The club is not as successful in football, however they won their first two titles, the Bahraini King's Cup and Bahraini Super Cup, in 2017. Patryk Bora, polish top player, played in this club in 2012.

Football achievements
Bahraini King's Cup
  Winners (1): 2016–17
Bahraini Super Cup
  Winners (1): 2017

Stadiums and facilities
The football club currently shares the Bahrain National Stadium (capacity 35,000) with four other clubs. Regular basketball matches are played in Um Al Hassam at the Zain Basketball Arena (capacity 2,000) while playoffs are held at the Khalifa Sport City Arena (capacity 4,000). The club's training facilities for football and basketball are located in Juffair.

Other sports
Besides football and basketball, Manama Club has teams for bowling.

Continental record

Basketball team

Manama Club also has a professional basketball team that plays in the Bahraini Premier League and is the most decorated team in national basketball history, having won a record 21 championships, 17 Cup titles, and 5 Super Cup titles. Currently, Manama also plays in the West Asia Super League (WASL). 

Manama plays in the BBA Arena (also known as the Zain Basketball Arena).

Honours

Domestic 
Bahraini Premier League

 Champions (21): 1977–78, 1989–90, 1990–91, 1991–92, 1992–93, 1994–95, 1996–97, 1997–98, 1998–99, 1999–2000, 2000–01, 2001–02, 2002–03, 2003–04, 2004–05, 2005–06, 2012–13, 2013–14, 2015–16, 2016–17, 2017–18, 2021–22

Bahraini Cup

 Champions (17): 2005, 2009, 2011, 2015, 2018, 2020, 2022

Bahraini Super Cup

 Champions (5): 2011, 2014, 2018, 2019

International 
FIBA Asia Champions Cup

 Third Place (1): 2000

Notable players 

Several former National Basketball Association (NBA) players have played for Manama Club.

  Josh Boone (2014–2015)
  Devin Ebanks (2021–2022)
  Jordan Crawford (2022–2023)
  Jerai Grant (2020)
  Davion Berry (2022–2023)
  Austin Daye (2016)
  D. J. Stephens (2019)

Head coaches 

  Sam Vincent (2014–2016)
  Miodrag Perišić (2016–2017)
  Josep Clarós (2016–2017)
  Linos Gavriel (2021–2022)

References

External links
fc-manama.com (Official website) 

 
Association football clubs established in 1946
Organisations based in Manama
1946 establishments in Bahrain
Sport in Manama